Laiaküla (Estonian for "Wide Village") is a subdistrict in the district of Pirita, Tallinn, the capital of Estonia. It has a population of 178.

See also
Pärnamäe Cemetery
Laiaküla (Viimsi Parish)

References 

Subdistricts of Tallinn